Nudi is a computer program to type in Kannada script.

The Karnataka government had funded the development of Nudi vide G.O ITD 234 A da vi 2001 Bangalore, dated 27.12.2001. It was published by Kannada Ganaka Parishat, a non-profit organisation. Upto version 5.0, it was developed based on the Monolingual font-encoding standard prescribed by the Government of Karnataka. From Nudi 6.0, it is based on Unicode. Nudi 6.1 is developed using AutoHotKey scripting.

Nudi supports most of the Windows based desktop Applications.

References

External links
Kagapa - Kannada Computer Council

Typography software
Science and technology in Karnataka